The Udzungwa forest partridge (Xenoperdix udzungwensis), also known as the Udzungwa partridge, is a small, approximately  long, boldly barred, brownish partridge with rufous face, grey underparts, olive-brown crown and upperparts. It has a red bill, brown iris and yellow legs. Both sexes are similar.

Discovered only in 1991, this bird was first noticed as a pair of strange feet in a cooking pot in a Tanzanian forest camp. It inhabits and is endemic to forests of the Udzungwa Mountains in Tanzania. A second population from the Rubeho Mountains was initially believed to be a well-marked subspecies, but is now recognized to be specifically distinct. The diet consists mainly of beetles, ants and seeds.

Due to ongoing habitat loss, small population size, limited range and overhunting in some areas, the Udzungwa forest partridge is classified as Endangered on the IUCN Red List of Threatened Species.

References 

Udzungwa forest partridge
Endemic birds of Tanzania
Udzungwa forest partridge